The Italian ambassador in Tunis is the official representative of the Government in Rome to the Government of Tunisia.

List of representatives 
<onlyinclude>

References 

Tunisia
Italy
Ambassadors